Federal Science and Technical College, Awka (FSTC Awka) is a federal government funded institution that teaches its students about science and technology. FSTC Awka is located in Awka, Anambra State, Nigeria in West Africa.

The college, Federal Science and Technical College (FSTC) Awka was established in May 2002 along with three other FSTCs spread along geographical divide of the Country.

History 
The college was established in May 2002 along with three other FSTCs spread along Geographical divide of the Country. It took off at the former site of Government Technical College (GTC) Awka, which was graciously donated by the government of Anambra State. It inherited a population of about 970 students from the former college and about 300 students admitted by NECO and NABTEB into JSS1 and STS1 respectively brought the population to 1,270 students.

The State Teachers were initially inherited until Education Officers were gradually posted to replace them. These Education Officers were drawn from all part of the Federation

Geographical location 

The Federal Science and Technical College, Awka is located in the heart of Awka City, the capital of Anambra State at the site of the former GTC, opposite St Paul on Zik Avenue, Awka.

References 

2002 establishments in Nigeria
Educational institutions established in 2002
Government schools in Nigeria
Education in Anambra State